The Arna Bontemps African American Museum was a museum in the United States city of Alexandria, Louisiana. The museum was housed in the restored home that was the birthplace of the poet Arna Bontemps, renowned as one of the leaders of the Harlem Renaissance.

The museum and cultural center was located at 1327 3rd Street, and was one of the first 26 featured sites on the Louisiana African American Heritage Trail.

See also
List of museums focused on African Americans

References

External links
Official website for the Arna Bontemps African American Museum
Louisiana African American Heritage Trail

African-American history of Louisiana
Louisiana African American Heritage Trail
African-American museums in Louisiana
Museums in Rapides Parish, Louisiana
Poetry museums
Louisiana Creole culture
Buildings and structures in Alexandria, Louisiana
Tourist attractions in Alexandria, Louisiana
Defunct museums in Louisiana